Günther Klaffenbach (20 June 1890 – 3 March 1972) was a German epigraphist. He was an editor of Inscriptiones Graecae from 1929, in succession to Friedrich Hiller von Gaertringen.

References 

Epigraphers
Hellenic epigraphers
Corresponding Fellows of the British Academy

1890 births
1972 deaths